The Special Preparedness Fund Act of 1917  provided for a "special preparedness fund for army, navy, and fortification purposes" through an excess profits tax on corporations and partnerships equal to 8% of the amount by which their net income exceeded $5,000 plus 8% of the "actual capital invested."

1917 in American law
United States tax law
United States federal legislation